Patriote was a  74-gun ship of the line of the French Navy. She was one of the French ships which had their hull doubled with copper.

Career 
In 1786, Patriote was under Captain Renaud d'Aleins, flag captain to Chef d'Escadre Albert de Rions, with Major d'escadre Buor de La Charoulière also aboard. She was the flagship of the Escadre d'évolution that organised a naval review and a simulated naval battle for the visit of Louis XVI to Cherbourg Naval Base.

From 1790 to 1791, Patriote was under Huon de Kermadec, part of the squadron under Bruni d'Entrecasteaux.

In September 1793, during the Siege of Toulon, she was taken by the British, who removed her armament and embarked the French sailors sympathetic to the Republic. Admiral Hood having agreed to transport them to a safe port, she then ferried them to Brest, where she arrived on 16 October.

In 1794 she took part in the battle of the Glorious First of June, in the Croisière du Grand Hiver winter campaign in 1794 and 1795, and in the Expédition d'Irlande in December 1796.
In 1806 she was damaged in a hurricane in the Caribbean and went to Chesapeake Bay for shelter where she was blockaded by the British along with Éole and laid off Annapolis for repairs until returning to France.
From 1821, she was used as a hulk.

Sources and references 
 Notes

Citations

References
 
 
 

Ships of the line of the French Navy
Téméraire-class ships of the line
1785 ships
Ships built in France